Jinan Center Financial City is a supertall skyscraper located in Jinan, Shandong, China. Construction started in 2014 and was completed in 2020. It is the tallest building in Jinan

See also
List of tallest buildings in China

References

Buildings and structures under construction in China
Skyscrapers in Jinan
Skyscraper office buildings in China